The Best of Nick Cave and the Bad Seeds is a compilation album by Australian rock band Nick Cave and the Bad Seeds, released on 11 May 1998.

Cave asked each of the Bad Seeds, past and present, to choose their favourite tracks from the ten albums—their lists would then be discussed until a final list was produced. Only guitarist and founding Bad Seed Mick Harvey responded, and it is his listing, unchanged, that makes up The Best Of.

As of 2001 the album has sold 500,000 copies worldwide.

Track listing
 "Deanna" – 3:36
 "Red Right Hand" (Single Version) – 4:48
 "Straight to You" – 4:35
 "Tupelo" (Single Version) – 5:12
 "Nobody's Baby Now" – 3:53
 "Stranger Than Kindness" – 4:42
 "Into My Arms" – 4:14
 "(Are You) The One That I've Been Waiting For?" – 4:06
 "The Carny" – 8:01
 "Do You Love Me?" (Single Version) – 4:37
 "The Mercy Seat" (Single Version) – 5:08
 "Henry Lee" (featuring PJ Harvey) – 3:56
 "The Weeping Song" (Single Version) – 4:20
 "The Ship Song" (Single Version) – 4:42
 "Where the Wild Roses Grow" (featuring Kylie Minogue) – 3:57
 "From Her to Eternity" – 5:32

Track 16 is taken from the 1984 album From Her to Eternity.
Track 4 is taken from the 1985 album The Firstborn Is Dead.
Tracks 6 and 9 are taken from the 1986 album Your Funeral... My Trial.
Tracks 1 and 11 are taken from the 1988 album Tender Prey.
Tracks 13 and 14 are taken from the 1990 album The Good Son.
Track 3 is taken from the 1992 album Henry's Dream.
Tracks 2, 5 and 10 are taken from the 1994 album Let Love In.
Tracks 12 and 15 are taken from the 1996 album Murder Ballads.
Tracks 7 and 8 are taken from the 1997 album The Boatman's Call.

NOTE: Tracks 2, 4, 10, 11, 13 and 14 are the edited single versions (but are not listed as edits in the liner notes).

Special edition
The album was also released as a special edition with a live bonus disc, titled "Live at the Royal Albert Hall", recorded on 19 and 20 May 1997. This bonus CD was later released in 2008 as a regular disk, with four additional tracks and without "The Weeping Song".

 "Lime Tree Arbour" – 3:42
 "Stranger Than Kindness" – 5:02
 "Red Right Hand" – 5:18
 "I Let Love In" – 4:12
 "Brompton Oratory" – 3:47
 "Henry Lee" – 4:00
 "The Weeping Song" – 4:38
 "The Ship Song" – 4:12
 "Where the Wild Roses Grow" – 4:01

Musicians
 Nick Cave – Vocals, Hammond, Organ, Oscillator, Piano, Harmonica, Backing Vocals, String Arrangement
 Blixa Bargeld – Guitar, "Boss Bellini", Backing Vocals, Slide Guitar, "Father" Vocal (on "The Weeping Song")
 Mick Harvey – Drums, Bass, Acoustic Guitar, Guitar, Shaker, Bell, Rhythm Guitar, Extra Piano, Hammond, Bass Guitar, Bass Organ, Backing Vocals, Piano, Xylophone, Glockenspiel, Loops, Vibraphone, Percussion, String Arrangement
 Kid Congo Powers – Guitar
 Martyn P. Casey – Bass, Backing Vocals
 Thomas Wydler – Drums, Timpani, Fish, Backing Vocals, Percussion
 Conway Savage – Piano, Backing Vocals
 Barry Adamson – Drums, Hammond, Backing Vocals, Bass
 Jim Sclavunos – Drums, Bells
 Tex Perkins – Backing Vocals
 Rowland S. Howard – Backing Vocals
 Roland Wolf – Guitar
 Gini Ball – Strings
 Audrey Riley – Strings
 Chris Tombling – Strings
 PJ Harvey – Vocals
 Kylie Minogue – Vocals
 Jen Anderson – Strings
 Sue Simpson – Strings
 Kerran Coulter – Strings
 Helen Mountfort – Strings
 Hugo Race – Guitar

Certifications

References

1998 greatest hits albums
Albums produced by Flood (producer)
Albums produced by Victor Van Vugt
Albums produced by Tony Cohen
Albums produced by David Briggs (producer)
Nick Cave compilation albums
Mute Records compilation albums